The Beurre Bosc or Bosc is a cultivar of the European pear (Pyrus communis), originally from France or Belgium. Also known as the Kaiser, it is grown in Europe, Australia, British Columbia and Ontario, Canada, and the northwestern U.S. states of California, Washington, and Oregon.

The Beurre Bosc was cultivated first in Belgium or France. The name Bosc is given after a French horticulturist named Louis Bosc, and "Beurré" means "buttery," referring to the fruit's soft, juicy texture.

Characteristic features are a long tapering neck and russet skin. Famous for its warm cinnamon color, the Bosc pear is often used in drawings, paintings, and photography due to its shape. Its white flesh is denser, crisper and smoother than that of the 'Williams' or 'D'Anjou' pear. It is called the "aristocrat of pears". It is suitable to be used in poaching.

History 
It is unclear whether the variety originated in Belgium or France. The first time that Bosc pears were seen was in the early 1800s.

Season 
The season of Bosc pears starts in autumn, all the way through spring.

In South Africa, Beurre Bosc pears are harvested from late January to early February.

Taste and ripeness 
Bosc pears are characterised by their hard flesh and brown skin. Early in their ripeness cycle they tend to be juicy, crunchy and sweet. When fully ripe the fruit becomes sweeter and softer, and the skin becomes wrinkly.

Extra fancy and fancy grade of bosc pear in Canada should be at least 54 mm in diameter. They should be smooth, clean and well formed.

Nutrition 
Most pears are a good source of fiber. A medium size pear can provide six grams of fiber. Pears are also a source of vitamin C and provide only  of food energy per serving. Moreover, pears are sodium free, fat free and cholesterol free.

Uses 
Since Bosc pears have a firm and solid flesh, they can be used in a variety of ways such as baking, broiling and poaching. They can maintain their form throughout the process making them a resilient fruit to use.

References

External links
USA Pears - Bosc Pear Profile

Pear cultivars